Jacob Daniel Brigham (born February 10, 1988) is an American professional baseball pitcher for the Wei Chuan Dragons of the Chinese Professional Baseball League (CPBL). He made his Major League Baseball (MLB) debut in 2015 with the Atlanta Braves, and has also played for the Tohoku Rakuten Golden Eagles of Nippon Professional Baseball (NPB) and Nexen / Kiwoom Heroes of the KBO League.

Career

Texas Rangers
Brigham attended Central Florida Christian Academy in Orlando, Florida, where he played for the school's baseball team. He pitched a no-hitter in 2005, his junior season, against West Oak, though he allowed two unearned runs. The Texas Rangers drafted Brigham in the sixth round (178th overall) of the 2006 Major League Baseball Draft. They added him to their 40-man roster after the 2011 season to protect him from the Rule 5 draft.

Chicago Cubs
In July 2012, Brigham was traded to the Chicago Cubs for Geovany Soto.

Second Stint with Rangers
He was traded back to the Rangers for Barret Loux on November 20, 2012. He was non tendered by the Rangers on November 30 and became a free agent, but re-signed with the Rangers on a minor league contract.

Brigham became a free agent again after the 2013 season.

Pittsburgh Pirates
He signed a minor league contract with the Pittsburgh Pirates' organization for the 2014 season.

Atlanta Braves
He signed with the Atlanta Braves' organization prior to the 2015 season. Brigham was called up to the majors for the first time on June 27, 2015.  Brigham made his Major League debut on June 30, 2015, pitching three innings against the Washington Nationals while striking out four batters and allowing only one hit. He elected free agency on November 6.

Detroit Tigers
On December 11, 2015, Brigham signed a minor-league contract with the Detroit Tigers.

Tohoku Rakuten Golden Eagles
On December 18, 2015, the Tigers sold Brigham's rights to the Tohoku Rakuten Golden Eagles.

Detroit Tigers (second stint)
On January 10, 2017, Brigham signed a minor-league contract with the Tigers.

Nexen/Kiwoom Heroes
On May 4, 2017, Brigham signed a contract with the Nexen Heroes of the KBO League. Brigham signed a $650,000 contract for the 2018 season with the Heroes on November 24, 2017. On November 23, 2018, Brigham re-signed to a $900,000 contract with the team, now named the Kiwoom Heroes, for the 2019 season. Brigham posted a 13–5 record with a 2.96 ERA over 158.1 innings in 2019. On December 9, 2019, Brigham re-signed with Kiwoom for the 2020 season on a $950,000 contract. Following the 2020 season, the Heroes announced they would part ways with Brigham, and he became a free agent.

Wei Chuan Dragons
On December 26, 2020, Brigham signed with the Wei Chuan Dragons of the Chinese Professional Baseball League for the 2021 season. On March 19, 2021, Brigham made his CPBL debut. Through his first four starts with the Dragons, Brigham pitched to a 0.42 ERA and 0.78 WHIP over 21.2 innings of work.

Kiwoom Heroes (second stint)
On April 15, 2021, Brigham's contract was purchased by the Kiwoom Heroes of the KBO League. In 10 starts, Brigham posted a 7–3 record with a 2.95 ERA. On September 4, 2021, Brigham parted ways with the club for personal reasons.

Wei Chuan Dragons (second stint)
On January 5, 2022, Brigham re-signed with the Wei Chuan Dragons of the Chinese Professional Baseball League for the 2022 season.

Personal life
Brigham and his wife, Taylor, have three daughters and a son 
He is the nephew of former White Sox catcher Ron Karkovice.

References

External links

KBO League Statistics

1988 births
Living people
American expatriate baseball players in Japan
American expatriate baseball players in South Korea
American expatriate baseball players in Taiwan
Arizona League Rangers players
Atlanta Braves players
Bakersfield Blaze players
Baseball players from Florida
Frisco RoughRiders players
Gwinnett Braves players
Hickory Crawdads players
Indianapolis Indians players
Jamestown Jammers players
KBO League pitchers
Kiwoom Heroes players
Major League Baseball pitchers
Mississippi Braves players
Nippon Professional Baseball pitchers
People from Winter Garden, Florida
Round Rock Express players
Spokane Indians players
Tennessee Smokies players
Tohoku Rakuten Golden Eagles players
Wei Chuan Dragons players